2013 Champions League may refer to:

Football
2012–13 UEFA Champions League
2013–14 UEFA Champions League
2013 AFC Champions League
2013 CAF Champions League

Cricket
2013 Champions League Twenty20